Etihad Airways was established as the national airline of the United Arab Emirates in July 2003 by Royal (Amiri) Decree issued by Sheikh Khalifa bin Zayed Al Nahyan. Services were launched with a ceremonial flight to Al Ain on 5 November 2003. On 12 November 2003, Etihad commenced commercial operations with the launch of services to Beirut, and has gone on to serve 74 passenger and 5 dedicated cargo destinations across five of six inhabited continents as of October 2018.

Map

List

Notes

References

Lists of airline destinations
Etihad Airways